Uster District is one of the twelve districts of the canton of Zürich, Switzerland. Its capital is the city of Uster.

Municipalities 
Uster contains a total of ten municipalities:

See also 
Municipalities of the canton of Zürich

References

 
Districts of the canton of Zürich